Our Christmas Wish is a Christmas and tenth studio album from Australian vocal group The Ten Tenors, released in November 2015. The album peaked at number 16 on the ARIA Charts in December 2015.

Proceeds from the sale of the album went towards to the Children’s Hospital Foundation.

Track listing

Charts

Year-end charts

Release history

References

The Ten Tenors albums
2015 Christmas albums
Christmas albums by Australian artists
Classical Christmas albums